The 5th Wheel was an American dating reality series that aired in syndication from 2001 to 2004. The show was initially hosted by comedian Aisha Tyler, but when Tyler left after completing the first season, the remaining two seasons were hosted in narration by announcer Tom Gottlieb.

The series' closing slogan was, "...where strangers become friends, friends become lovers, and lovers become bitter, suicidal exes all on the same show." However, when Gottlieb took over the show, the catchphrase was altered accordingly to say "...where strangers become lovers and lovers become bitter suicidal exes all in the same show."

Synopsis
The show would begin with two men and two women, all of whom were sent out on a joint date where each couple would spend time with each other and then switch to spend time with the other man/woman (the show never did any episodes with entirely same-sex contestants). Then a 5th man or woman (hence, "the fifth wheel") would join the group, usually as a more outgoing/sensual counterpoint to the initial 4 contestants. After a mix of dates involving the initial players and the 5th wheel, every contestant would write down the name of the person they'd like to go out with again, and everyone would reveal their selections at the end of the show to see who won and who lost; the "ideal" result for the show would involve two couples picking each other and one poor person being left out, though in one case a man and woman chose each other and the other man and TWO women (including the 5th wheel) all chose each other; this episode involved the FFM pair taking off each others' clothes (this was edited so it was not shown explicitly in the TV broadcast) in the private room that the show made available for hookups if wanted. Picking nobody was an option for all contestants, though it was seldom used. The cameras would follow their every move, while commentary in the form of subtitles, animations, and "thought bubbles" (similar to the style used in Pop-Up Video) was added by the show's producers. At the end, they would all vote on whom they would like to go out with, and an option of choosing "nobody" as well. The show was cancelled in 2004.

Production notes
The series was produced by Renegade Productions, a subdivision of Bobwell Productions/Gold Coast Entertainment—the same company that produced Blind Date (which would often air before The 5th Wheel) -- but was more provocative and sexual in nature than its sister series, offering crazier and more elaborate subtitles and superimposed animated jokes which altered the appearance of the scene featuring each couple.

Crew
The 5th Wheel's credits listed veteran comedy writers Rob Dames, Vance DeGeneres, Martin Olson and Archie Gips.

Syndication
Reruns were eventually aired on Fox Reality, but later was removed from its lineup. An "uncensored" version of the series without pixelated nudity or profanity censored was made available via pay-per-view and video on demand under the Too Much For TV branding of American PPV provider In Demand, and remains a part of the service's rotation several years after the show's departure from broadcast television.

References

External links
 Official Website
 

2001 American television series debuts
2004 American television series endings
2000s American reality television series
American dating and relationship reality television series
English-language television shows
First-run syndicated television programs in the United States
Television series by Universal Television